The  Cleveland Gladiators season was the twelfth season for the franchise in the Arena Football League and the third while in Cleveland. The team was coached by Steve Thonn and played their home games at Quicken Loans Arena. The Gladiators finished the regular season 10–8, and qualified for the playoffs as the 2nd seed in the American Conference. They lost to the Georgia Force in the conference semifinals, 41–50.

Standings

Schedule

Regular season
The Gladiators had a bye week in Week 1 and opened the season on the road against the Spokane Shock on March 19. Their first home game of the season was played against the Chicago Rush on April 2. They hosted the Utah Blaze in their regular season finale.

Playoffs

Roster

Regular season

Week 1: BYE

Week 2: at Spokane Shock

Week 3: at Tampa Bay Storm

Week 4: vs. Chicago Rush

Week 5: BYE

Week 6: vs. New Orleans VooDoo

Week 7: at Jacksonville Sharks

Week 8: vs. Tulsa Talons

Week 9: vs. Milwaukee Mustangs

Week 10: at Orlando Predators

Week 11: vs. Philadelphia Soul

Week 12: at Arizona Rattlers

Week 13: at Pittsburgh Power

Week 14: vs. Georgia Force

Week 15: at Kansas City Command

Week 16: vs. San Jose SaberCats

Week 17: at Milwaukee Mustangs

Week 18: at Philadelphia Soul

Week 19: vs. Pittsburgh Power

Week 20: vs. Utah Blaze

Playoffs

American Conference Semifinals: vs. (3) Georgia Force

References

Cleveland Gladiators
Cleveland Gladiators seasons
Cleve